Santo Antônio do Monte (Portuguese, St. Antony of the Hill) is a municipality in the central part of the state of Minas Gerais, Brazil. The population is 28,427 (2020 est.) in an area of 1125.78 km². The city is located 194 km west of state capital Belo Horizonte. The city is also known as Samonte. 
Santo Antonio do Monte was founded in the 18th century and it became a municipality on November 16, 1875. The main economic activity of the city is the production of fireworks. Nowadays there are in the city about 70 firework factories.

Neighboring municipalities
Divinópolis
Lagoa da Prata
Formiga
Pedra do Indaiá
São Sebastião do Oeste
Arcos
Luz
Bom Despacho

References

External links
 http://www.citybrazil.com.br/mg/stoantoniomonte/
Prefeitura de Santo Antônio do Monte (government site)

Municipalities in Minas Gerais